Skeleton on Horseback aka The White Disease is a 1937 Czechoslovak drama film directed by and starring Hugo Haas. It revolves around an infectious disease which breaks out during a war. It is based on the play The White Disease by Karel Čapek.

Cast
 Hugo Haas as Dr. Galén
 Bedřich Karen as Professor Sigelius
 Zdeněk Štěpánek as The Marshal
 Václav Vydra as Baron Olaf Krog
 František Smolík as Krog's Accountant
 Helena Friedlová as Accountant's Wife
 Ladislav Boháč as Krog's nephew
 Karla Oličová as The Marshal's Daughter Aneta
 Jaroslav Průcha as Dr. Martin
 Vladimír Šmeral as First Assistant
 Vítězslav Boček as Accountant's Son
 Eva Svobodová as Accountant's Daughter

Reception
In a contemporary review, the film was reviewed in Variety in 1940, who noted that Čapek's conception "isn't entirely clear, he appears to be taking the dramatic theme that Fascism is a sort of white plague that scourges the people who follow its philosophy." The reviewer noted that Čapek's "thinking is logical [but] he has certainly over-simplified the struggle between war and peace." The review continued that the film contained "many gripping scenes" praising "moments such as the meeting between the doctor and the dictator and the solitary vigil as zero hour for the invasion approaches, while "mob scenes are comparatively inept, and such matters as sound, lighting, photography and so on are inferior."

References

External links
 

1930s science fiction drama films
1937 films
Czechoslovak black-and-white films
Czechoslovak science fiction drama films
1930s Czech-language films
Films about viral outbreaks
Films directed by Hugo Haas
Czech science fiction drama films
1937 drama films
Adaptations of works by Karel Čapek
1930s Czech films